Date and time notation around the world varies.

An approach to harmonise the different notations is the ISO 8601. (See also ISO 8601 usage)

Since the Internet is a main enabler of communication between people with different date notation background, and software is used to facilitate the communication, RFC standards and W3C tips and discussion paper were published.

  "Standard for the Format of Arpa Internet Text Messages"
 published 1982-08-13
 e.g. used for email
 format: [day ,] 20 Jun 82 14:01:17
  "Internet Calendaring and Scheduling Core Object Specification"
 format: 19960401T235959Z
  "Date and Time on the Internet: Timestamps"
 published July 2002
 intended use: new internet protocols
 format: 1982-06-20
 W3C: "Use international date format (ISO)"

See also 

 Date and time representation by country
 
 Date code on a semiconductor package
 Holocene calendar
 Time formatting and storage bugs
 Unix time

Date and time representation